Mikhail Safonov may refer to:

Mikhail Safonov (pilot) (1893–1924), Russian pilot
Mikhail Safonov (diver) (born 1947), Russian Olympic diver